Abrams & Bettes Beyond the Forecast, commonly abbreviated Abrams & Bettes, Beyond the Forecast, or A&B, is a weather program that was produced by The Weather Channel.

History
Launched 25 September 2006, the show was named for its primary pair of on-camera meteorologists, Stephanie Abrams and Mike Bettes. In its final five months, the one-hour program immediately preceded an hour of Evening Edition also hosted by Abrams and Bettes that featured exactly the same content and format of that night's Abrams & Bettes broadcast. The program consists of weather maps, news, and discussion.

On February 27, 2009, the last edition of Abrams & Bettes aired. The show was replaced by Weather Center with Abrams and Bettes from 7 PM EST to 10 PM EST Monday through Friday with Paul Goodloe and Alexandra Steele hosting a separate 10 PM EST edition of the show with a different format than the 7 PM EST show.

In June 2009, in preparation for the premiere of Wake Up with Al a month later, Abrams & Bettes moved from Weather Center to Your Weather Today.

References

External links
 Abrams & Bettes: Beyond the Forecast Official Site
 Abrams & Bettes: Beyond the Forecast page on Twitter

The Weather Channel original programming
2006 American television series debuts
2009 American television series endings